Errol Bill (born 16 January 1939) is an Australian former field hockey player. He competed in the men's tournament at the 1960 Summer Olympics.

References

External links
 

1939 births
Living people
Australian male field hockey players
Olympic field hockey players of Australia
Field hockey players at the 1960 Summer Olympics
People from the Riverina
Sportsmen from New South Wales